Anastrepta is a genus of liverworts belonging to the family Anastrophyllaceae.

The species of this genus are found in Eurasia and Northern America.

Species:
 Anastrepta bifida (Stephani) Stephani
 Anastrepta longissima (Stephani) Stephani
 Anastrepta orcadensis (Hook.) Schiffner

References

Jungermanniales
Jungermanniales genera